Ted Peters Famous Smoked Fish is a historic smoked fish and hamburger restaurant in South Pasadena, Florida.

History 
Restaurant was established in 1947 on Madeira Beach by founder Ted Peters, who moved it to South Pasadena in 1949. The eatery serves wood smoked mullet and hamburgers in a casual atmosphere of stools and picnic tables. Jeff Klinkenberg called it one of the most famous eateries in Pinellas County and included a section on it in his book Seasons of Florida. It has been featured on The Best Thing I Ever Ate and Diners, Drive-Ins and Dives. German potato salad and Manhattan clam chowder have also become classic dishes at the restaurant. Ted Peters died in 2003 at 91. Ted Peters is located at 1350 Pasadena Avenue. Fruit pies made by Ted's mom were once a feature of the business.

See also

 List of hamburger restaurants
 List of seafood restaurants

References 

Seafood restaurants in Florida
Hamburger restaurants in the United States
Buildings and structures in Pinellas County, Florida
1947 establishments in Florida
Restaurants established in 1947